Winthorpe is a small coastal village in the East Lindsey district of Lincolnshire, England.

Winthorpe was both an ancient parish, and a civil parish, until 1926 when it was abolished. A small part of it enlarged Addlethorpe parish, and the larger part of it enlarged Skegness parish. 
The manor belonged to Lord Monson.

The church is dedicated to Saint Mary and is a Grade I listed building dating from the 13th century, although most of it is 15th-century. Today St Marys forms part of the Skegness Group of Churches, which also includes: St Matthews, Skegness; St Clement, Skegness; St Peter and St Paul, Ingoldmells; and St Nicholas, Addlethorpe.

References

External links

Villages in Lincolnshire
Populated coastal places in Lincolnshire
East Lindsey District